Iman Sanchooli (born August 12, 1993 in Golestan) is an Iranian karateka. He has participated in Two world karate championships (2014 - 2016) and he won two gold medals.also he won the silver medal of  2015 Asian Karate Championships, and more than 10 medals of Open Karate Tournament and Karate Premier league.

Early life 

Iman Sanchooli was born in Galikesh , Golestan , on August 12, 1993, He began Karate training at age 7 with his first coach Aliakbar Barani in Galikesh City. Winning several medals of provincial and national championships ,then he became a member of Iran National Karate team.

Sanchooli immigrated to Northern Ireland Country in 2017 then he participated in 2018 and 2019  the British Karate Championships and won two Gold Medals. Additionally competed in the Serie A-2019 Turkey Karate Premier League as a member of the Northern Ireland national team, and achieved 5th place in the 84 kg category.

See also 

 World karate Championships
 Asian Karate Championships
 Karate1 Premier League

References

External links 

 Iman Sanchooli on Facebook
 Iman Sanchooli on The sports website
 Iman Sanchooli on WKF
 Iman Sanchooli on Instagram

1993 births
Living people
Iranian male karateka
21st-century Iranian people